The Serb uprising of 1848–49, also known as the Serb revolution of 1848–49 and Serb People's Movement of 1848–49, took place in what is today Vojvodina, Serbia, and was part of the Revolutions of 1848 in the Austrian Empire. During the Hungarian Revolution, Hungarians achieved significant military successes, but were defeated after Russian intervention. Serbs led fierce battles against the Hungarians for autonomy or merge with the help of volunteers from the Principality of Serbia. The outcome of the uprising was the establishment of Serbian Vojvodina (then Voivodeship of Serbia and Banat of Temeschwar), a special autonomous region under the Austrian crown. However, the Voivodeship failed certain expectations that Serbian patriots had expressed at the May Assembly (1848). Serbs did not constitute an absolute majority of the population, while the administration was largely in the hands of German officials and officers. The Voivodeship was abolished in 1860, however, some rights were kept by the Serb community. The Serbian Patriarchate was renewed, while the uprising had increased national awareness of the Serb people north of the Sava and Danube in the struggle for freedom.

Background
The autocratic methods of chancellor Metternich turned the Austrian Empire into a police state. It systematically suppressed any open-minded movement that would in some way undermined the blessed order. Metternich was conservative by nature and by conviction. The Austrian Empire, made up of various nationalities, was a remnant of the old political conjuncture and it had hard to get used to the new time. In the 16th century there were still various small nations and states connected to Austria, which halted the larger community to better successfully resist the Ottoman threat. However, after the suppression of the Ottomans the needs of a centralized state disappeared. In its place, the awakening of national consciousness from the beginning of the 19th century, the Austrian community had increasingly aspired to enter into the framework of national states. The Italians, until then scattered, began to work on their national unification; the same movement occurred in the Germans. In both nations the realization of these plans could be achieved only at the expense of the estates of the Austrian Empire and the prestige of the Habsburg dynasty. Even then, in the mid-19th century, there was a lot of worries in Vienna that a free Serbian state in the Balkans could become an attractive point for its South Slavic subjects. The whole movement to strengthen mutual Slavic bonds, dubbed Pan-Slavism, was viewed with much suspicion as a pure political action under the leadership of Russia and with a view that it would ultimately serve her. The nationalist activity of Hungarians, very lively and impulsive in the first half of the 19th century, gradually received the character of a national struggle for full independence from Vienna. There was fighting on all sides. Metternich was aware of this, and as his only means for maintaining the state, he clamped down on the rebels. He did not manage to do anything notable to channel the currents with the previous measures, nor managed to rely on the part of the population that sincerely sought change in the system, but which had not yet come out of the frame of the state union.

When in February 1848, the revolution broke out in Paris which destroyed the monarchy and led to the proclamation of the republic in France, it rocked from the foundations and crumbling Austrian building; uprisings broke out everywhere. German patriots gathered in Frankfurt in an All-German Parliament, which clearly expressed its desire for German unification, but not under the leadership of Austria. As a response, the All-Slavic meeting in Prague followed, in which several Serbs participated. Simultaneously to these political manifestation, fights began on the street. There were even alarms in loyal imperial Vienna. Metternich needed to be sacrificed, but it did not calm the boiling spirits, especially not where the movement got not only the character of the struggle for constitutional freedoms, but also for national liberation.

Prelude
The Hungarians became the most dangerous in Austria, led by a very temperamented orator Lajos Kossuth. In their nationalism, the Hungarians never had enough measures. On the area of the Crown of St. Stephen they were a constant minority in relation to the other nationalities, however, their state was represented and led by only them. Fearing that they would lose that supremacy or have to share it, they began efforts by all means to preserve a Hungarian character to the state. In this pursuit they were necessary to come into conflict with other nationalities, primarily with the Serbs and Croats. The Serbs had their privileges with a kind of religious autonomy, which the Hungarians had long looked down upon, and which was in danger to one day be abolished. Croats had also kept their historical rights and especially their language, which use was narrowed by organization of the Hungarians. The Viennese government had often used the Serbs and Croats, whose militancy was well known, as its instrument to curb Hungary's desires. This created an even larger gap between them and the Hungarians, because along with opposition from the Hungarians, it came in a moment of absolute disbelief.

When the news came of the riots in Paris and then those in Vienna, and when it became clear what the Hungarian intended to seek, the Serbs and Croats immediately raised their voice. Zagreb had become very active under the leadership of Ban Josip Jelačić, a Frontier colonel, who almost from the beginning gave his movement a combative character, but at the same time showed affection towards the Habsburg dynasty. The Frontiersmen were the best part of the Austrian army, and they were at this time the more loyal to the Austrian court than many German regiments. In this spirit, of loyalty and impeccable performance of service, the Frontiersmen (Serbs and Croats alike) were mannered for centuries. A popular song went When the Holy Emperor desires, the Frontiersman jumps into death!.

As part of the Revolutions of 1848, the Serbs under Austria-Hungary demanded what they had in the previous century; recognition of Serbian as official language, equality of the Orthodox church as with Catholics, and annual church assembly gatherings. They met at Sremski Karlovci and Novi Sad.

May Assembly

 

Several thousand Serbs met at the May Assembly in Sremski Karlovci on 1 May 1848. The delegates chose Šupljikac as voivode, the civil and military commander. Josif Rajačić was elected the patriarch of the Serbs. The Serbs demanded a national unit consisting of Banat, Backa, Baranja and part of Srem, known collectively as Vojvodina.

Uprising

During the revolutions, there was much fighting in Vojvodina, in June, Hungarian and Serbian bands began fighting. General Stratimirović, head of the main committee, on 10 May, urged Prince Aleksandar for assistance and asked Stevan Knićanin, a commissioner, to intercede. Knićanin was elected military commander. In June and July a large wave of volunteers from the Principality entered Vojvodina, Knićanin arrived at 25 July. The new emperor Franz Joseph approved the appointments of Šupljikac and Rajačić. Šupljikac became the supreme military commander of the Serbian national troops on 6 October.

Battles
 Battle of Pančevo (2 January 1849), Serbian victory
 Battle of Vršac (January 1849), Serbian victory
 Battle of Sombor (1849), Hungarian victory
 Battle of Sirig (1849), Hungarian victory
 Battle of Horgoš (1849), Hungarian victory
 Battle of Srbobran (3 April 1849), Hungarian victory
 Battles for Šajkaška (1849)
 Mošorin and Vilovo (12 April), Serbian victory
 Kać and Budisav (6 May), Serbian victory
 Vilovo, Titel and Mošorin (22–26 May), Serbian victory
 Vilovo and Mošorin (1 May), Serbian victory
 Bombing of Novi Sad (12 June)

References

Sources and further reading

 
 
 
 
 
 
 
 
 
 
 
 
 
 
 
 
 Popović, Radomir J. "Аврам Петронијевић и српски покрет у Војводини 1848-1849. године." Историјски часопис 57 (2008): 237-252.
 
 
 

Revolutions of 1848 in the Austrian Empire
Serb rebellions
Habsburg Serbs
Serbian Vojvodina
19th-century rebellions
Rebellions in Serbia
Military history of Serbia